Jabalpur district is a district of Madhya Pradesh state in central India. The city of Jabalpur is the administrative headquarters of the district.

The area of the district is 5,198 km² with population of 2,463,289 (2011 census). As of 2011 it is the second most populous district of Madhya Pradesh (out of 50), after Indore.

Jabalpur district is located in the Mahakoshal region of Madhya Pradesh, on the divide between the watersheds of Narmada and the Son, but mostly within the valley of the Narmada, which here runs through the famous gorge known as the Marble rocks, and falls 30 ft. over a rocky ledge (the Dhuan Dhar, or misty shoot ). It consists of a long narrow plain running north-east and south-west and shut in on all sides by highlands. This plain, which forms an offshoot from the great valley of the Narmada, is covered in its western and southern portions by a rich alluvial deposit of black cotton soil. At Jabalpur city, the soil is black cotton soil, and water plentiful near the surface. The north and east belong to the basin of the Son River, a tributary of the Ganges and Yamuna, the south and west to the Narmada basin. The district is traversed by the main railway from Mumbai to Kolkata, and by branches of two other lines which meet at Katni junction.

Geography
The district is part of Jabalpur Division. It has an average elevation of 411 metres (1348 ft).

Climate

Demographics 

According to the 2011 census Jabalpur district has a population of 2,463,289 roughly equal to the nation of Kuwait or the US state of Nevada. This gives it a ranking of 180th in India (out of a total of 640). Its population growth rate over the decade 2001-2011 was 14.39%. Jabalpur has a sex ratio of 925 females for every 1000 males, and a literacy rate of 82.47%. 58.46% of the population lives in urban areas. Scheduled Castes and Tribes made up 14.13% and 15.23% of the population respectively.

Hindus are majority religion in Jabalpur district with 87.65%, Muslims with 8.27% and rest of Jains, Sikhs and Christians.

Languages

At the time of the 2011 Census of India, 94.21% of the population in the district spoke Hindi and 1.93% Urdu as their first language.

The dialect of the region is Baghelkhandi. Other languages spoken in the district by a significant number of people in the district include Marathi, Punjabi, Sindhi and Bengali, almost exclusively in Jabalpur city.

Education 
Jabalpur is an important educational centre of the Madhya Pradesh state. Jabalpur has Rani Durgavati University, Jawahar Lal Nehru Krishi University, Madhya Pradesh Pashu Chikitsa University, Netaji Subhash Chandra Bose Medical College, Dharmashastra National Law University Madhya Pradesh Ayurvigyan University and Maharshi Mahesh Yogi Vedic University. Good educational institutes in Jabalpur include Govt. Engineering College, Medical College, Government M.H. College of Home Science and Science, Law Colleges, Post Graduate and under-Graduate Colleges. The Indian Institute of Information Technology, Design & Manufacturing (IIITDM) Jabalpur was established in January 2005. Institute would serve as an inter-disciplinary institution for education and research by keeping the concept of Product Lifecycle Management (PLM) in mind.

It has some very reputed and old schools. Some of the schools are more than a century old. Apart from these educational institutions there a number of institutes offering various professional courses in Computers, Fashion Designing, Fine Arts etc.

References

External links

Jabalpur District web site

 
Districts of Madhya Pradesh